The 2003–04 Liechtenstein Cup was the fifty-ninth season of Liechtenstein's annual cup competition. Seven clubs competed with a total of sixteen teams for one spot in the first qualifying round of the UEFA Cup. Defending champions were FC Vaduz, who have won the cup continuously since 1998.

Qualifying round 

|colspan="3" style="background-color:#99CCCC; text-align:center;"|23 September 2003

|-
|colspan="3" style="background-color:#99CCCC; text-align:center;"|24 September 2003

|}

First round

|colspan="3" style="background-color:#99CCCC; text-align:center;"|21 October 2003

|-
|colspan="3" style="background-color:#99CCCC; text-align:center;"|22 October 2003

|-
|colspan="3" style="background-color:#99CCCC; text-align:center;"|1 April 2004

|}

Quarterfinals 

|colspan="3" style="background-color:#99CCCC; text-align:center;"|7 April 2004

|-
|colspan="3" style="background-color:#99CCCC; text-align:center;"|10 April 2004

|-
|colspan="3" style="background-color:#99CCCC; text-align:center;"|12 April 2004

|}

Semifinals 

|colspan="3" style="background-color:#99CCCC; text-align:center;"|5 May 2004

|-
|colspan="3" style="background-color:#99CCCC; text-align:center;"|19 May 2004

|}

Final

External links 
Official site of the LFV
RSSSF

Liechtenstein Football Cup seasons
Cup
Liechtenstein Cup